is a Shinto shrine in Tottori, Tottori Prefecture, Japan. In 1937, its trees were designated a Natural Monument.

See also

Monuments of Japan

References

Shinto shrines in Tottori Prefecture
Natural monuments of Japan